Kenneth Norman Thomson Lee (23 June 191515 January 2008) was a fighter pilot in the Royal Air Force (RAF).  He flew with 501 Squadron in the Battle of France where he shot down five German bombers to become an ace. On 18 August, he was one of four Hurricane pilots shot down by Gerhard Schöpfel.

References

1915 births
2008 deaths
British World War II fighter pilots
British World War II flying aces
Royal Air Force officers
Recipients of the Distinguished Flying Cross (United Kingdom)